Loisingha railway station is a railway station on the East Coast Railway network in the state of Odisha, India. It serves Loisingha town. Its code is LSX. It has two platforms. Passenger, Express and Superfast trains halt at Loisingha railway station.

Major trains

 Ispat Express
 Sambalpur–Rayagada Intercity Express
 Tapaswini Express
 Bhubaneswar–Bolangir Intercity Superfast Express

See also
 Balangir district

References

Railway stations in Balangir district
Sambalpur railway division